Zelená Hora may refer to places in the Czech Republic:

Zelená Hora (Vyškov District), a municipality and village in the South Moravian Region
Zelená Hora Castle, a castle in the Plzeň Region
Zelená Hora, an administrative part of Kraslice in the Karlovy Vary Region
Zelená Hora, a village and part of Lužany (Plzeň-South District) in the Plzeň Region
Zelená hora, a hill in the Vysočina Region, location of the Pilgrimage Church of Saint John of Nepomuk

See also
Zielona Góra, a city in Poland called Zelená Hora in Czech